The 2011 Gold Coast Sevens was the first tournament of the 2011-2012 Sevens World Series It was held over the weekend of 25–26 November 2011 at Robina Stadium (known for sponsorship reasons as Skilled Park) in Queensland, Australia. The tournament was the ninth completed edition of the Australian Sevens and the first on the Gold Coast after the event had been previously hosted in Adelaide and Brisbane.

Fiji won the tournament by defeating New Zealand in the Cup final 26–12.

Format
The teams are divided into pools of four teams, and a round-robin played within each pool. Points in rugby sevens pools are awarded on a different basis to most rugby tournaments: 3 for a win, 2 for a draw, 1 for a loss.

The top two teams in each pool advance to the Cup competition, and the four Cup quarterfinal losers drop into the bracket to play for the Plate. The bottom two teams in each pool go to the Bowl competition, and the four Bowl quarterfinal losers drop into the bracket to play for the Shield.

Teams
The participating teams were announced on 8 September.

Pool stage
The draw was made on 7 November.

All times are local (UTC+10).

Pool A

Pool B

Pool C

Pool D

Knockout stage

Shield

Bowl

Plate

Cup

References

External links

Gold Coast Sevens
Australian Sevens
Gold Coast Sevens
Sport on the Gold Coast, Queensland